Khodadad Jalali is an Iranian film director and screenwriter. He is best known for winning the ″Best Director Award″ at Mediterranean Film Festival Cannes and Helsinki Festival for ‘A Baby With Red Socks’ in 2017. He also has participated in film festivals as a jury member and the head of the jury team.

Career 
Jalali  was born in 1972 in Tehran. He started his directing career in 1993. Jalali has written and directed several short films including some documentary and some feature films.

Awards

Jury Member Of International Film Festivals 
 Head of the jury team of Mediterranean Film Festival Cannes, 2017.
 Head of the jury team of Quito film festival, 2016.
 Jury Member Of International Film Festival of Shimla, 2017.
 Jury Member of La Paz International Film Festival, 2017.

References

External links

1972 births
Living people
Iranian film directors